Choi Kook-hee (born 1976), is a South Korean film director and screenwriter. Choi wrote and directed his debut sports film Split (2016) which won New Flesh Award for Best First Feature at the 2017 Fantasia International Film Festival.

Filmography 
Blue Decoding (short film, 2002) – director
Tale of Cinema (2005) – directing department
The Springtime of Life (short film, 2006) – director, screenwriter
The Sundays of August (2006) – actor
Carnival (short film, 2007) – director, screenwriter
Split (2016) – director, screenwriter 
Default (2018) – director
Life is Beautiful (2022) – director

Awards 
2017 Fantasia International Film Festival: New Flesh Award for Best First Feature (Split)

References

External links 
 
 
 

1976 births
Living people
South Korean film directors
South Korean screenwriters